Valentine Python (born 18 Juni 1975 in Neuchâtel) is a Swiss climatologist and a member in the National Council of Switzerland of the Green Party of Switzerland (GPS).

Education and early life 
Valentine Python was born on 18 June 1975 in Neuchâtel. She studied history and geography at the University of Neuchâtel and graduated in 2006 with a master's degree. In 2010 she completed her doctorate at the École Polytechnique Fédérale de Lausanne (EPFL).

Professional career 
While still preparing her Doctorate at the EPFL, she studied the report of the Intergovernmental Panel on Climate Change (IPPC) from 2007 onwards and she defends the view that the human being has a responsibility in the global warming effect.

She also writes a blog on environmental issues for the newspaper Le Temps.

Political career 
Valentine Python only joined the Green Party in 2018 and was directly elected to the municipal council of La Tour-de-Peilz. In the Swiss parliamentary elections in 2019 Python ran for the National Council and became the first candidate to succeed. After Adèle Thorens Goumaz was elected into the Council of States on 10 November 2019, Phyton slipped into the National Council as her successor. She was sworn in as a national councilor on 2 December 2019. In parliament, she took a seat in the science, education and culture as well as the environmental commission.

Political positions 
She introduced a bill on a feasibility study to evaluate an eventual introduction of a tax on financial transfers and she defends the view that the human being has a responsibility in the global warming effect. In 2023, she introduced a bill which demanded from the Federal Council an evaluation on how to prevent the denial of climate change.

Personal life 
Her place of origin is Bôle in Neuchâtel.

References 

1975 births
Swiss climatologists
People from Neuchâtel
Living people
École Polytechnique Fédérale de Lausanne alumni
University of Neuchâtel alumni